The Tokara habu (Protobothrops tokarensis) is a venomous pit viper species endemic to the Tokara Islands of Japan. No subspecies are currently recognized.

Description
Scalation includes 31 (31-33) rows of dorsal scales at midbody, 199-210 ventral scales, 72-84 subcaudal scales, and 8 (7-9) supralabial scales.

Geographic range
Found in Japan on the islands of Takara-jima and Kotakara-jima. According to Golay et al. (1993), the type locality is "Takara-jima, province of Kagoshima, Ryukyu Islands".

See also
Snakebite

References

Further reading
Nagai, Kamehiko. 1928. Tokara-Habu & Erabu-unagi. Kagoshimaken Hakubutsu-Chosa (Report on the Natural History of the Province of Kagoshima - Society for the Education and Survey of the Kagoshima Prefecture) 3: 1-64. (Trimeresurus tokarensis, p. 6.) National Diet Library Digital Collections

External links

tokarensis
Reptiles of Japan
Reptiles described in 1928